This article lists the squads for the 2010 Men's Hockey World Cup, held between 28 February – 13 March 2010 in New Delhi, India

Pool A

Argentina
Head coach: Pablo Lombi

Canada
Head coach: Alan Brahmst

Germany
Head coach: Markus Weise

Netherlands
Head coach: Michel van den Heuvel

New Zealand
Head coach: Shane McLeod

Korea
Head coach: Seok Kyo Shin

Pool B

Australia
Head coach: Ric Charlesworth

England
Head coach: Jason Lee

India
Head coach: Jose Brasa

Pakistan
Head coach: Shahid Ali Khan

South Africa
Head coach: Gregg Clark

Spain
Head coach: Dani Martin

References

Squads
Men's Hockey World Cup squads